Polly W. Beal (born March 1, 1942) is a former member of the Wisconsin State Assembly.

Biography
Beal was born on March 1, 1942, in Racine, Wisconsin. She graduated from Boston University. Beal is married with three children and has served as director of the Skylight Opera Theatre in Milwaukee, Wisconsin.

Political career
Beal was a member of the Assembly in 1993. She is a Republican.

References

Politicians from Racine, Wisconsin
Republican Party members of the Wisconsin State Assembly
Women state legislators in Wisconsin
Boston University alumni
1942 births
Living people
21st-century American women